Joseph Haslet (1769June 20, 1823) was an American planter and politician from Cedar Creek Village in Cedar Creek Hundred, Sussex County, Delaware. He was a member of the Democratic-Republican Party, who served twice as Governor of Delaware.

Early life and family
Haslet was born in Milford, Delaware, son of Colonel John Haslet and Jemima Molleston Brinkle Haslet. Colonel John Haslet was the commander of the Delaware Regiment in the Continental Army and was killed at the Battle of Princeton in January 1777. Jemima Haslet died a month later "of an inflammation in the throat and lungs." Chief Justice William Killen became guardian for the children and eventually Joseph was apprenticed to a watchmaker in Wilmington. After he came of age he bought a farm in Cedar Creek Hundred in Sussex County. He first married Mary Draper, with whom he had one child, Nathaniel. He later married Rachel Hickman and they had at least three children.

Professional and political career
Haslet ran for governor in 1804, losing to the Federalist candidate, Nathaniel Mitchell, and again in 1807, again losing to the Federalist candidate, George Truitt. Finally, in 1810 he squeaked out a victory against Federalist candidate Daniel Rodney and began his first term as Governor of Delaware, serving from January 15, 1811 until January 18, 1814.

The War of 1812 was the central event of Haslet's tenure as governor. Entry into the War of 1812 was not met with much approval from Federalist Delaware, but Haslet was a Democrat and called the General Assembly into special session to raise militia. Carol Hoffecker in Democracy in Delaware describes him saying: "'Without your aid,' the governor told the predominantly Federalist legislators, 'compliance is impossible.' The militia was in shambles, he said, without arms or organization. But he was certain that Delaware would rise to the challenge. 'In this state it is not a question of whether the authority of the United States is to be respected. The State of Delaware will never hesitate to cooperate with her sister states in defending the common rights of the nation.'" <ref>{{cite book |last= Hoffecker |first= Carol E |title= Democracy in Delaware |year=2006 |publisher= Cedar Tree Books |location= Wilmington, Delaware |quote =Journal of the House of Representatives (1812), p. 4-6. |page= 70}}</ref> The General Assembly then voted to create a 1,000 man militia and appropriated $25,000 to equip them.

At first, there were several exciting naval victories, including the capture of the British ship Frolic'' by Captain Jacob Jones of Smyrna, Delaware. He was brother-in-law of former Governor James Sykes. By February 1813, however, the British sent fleets into both the Delaware and Chesapeake Bays. For protection an encampment was built at "the Rocks" in Wilmington, Captain Caleb P. Bennett fortified New Castle, and Pea Patch Island was deeded to the U.S. Government so that there might be a fort built there.

Lewes was completely exposed and, as expected, received repeated demands for supplies by the British fleet. Haslet and the militia rushed to Lewes' defense. Having refused the demands, on April 6, 1813 Lewes was subjected to a furious all day bombardment, followed by a half-hearted landing the next day. The bombardment actually did little damage. Scharf's account reports "one chicken was killed and one pig wounded," but over 300 cannonballs were picked up, including 40 or 50 that were 32-pounders. The landing the next day was beaten off as well. By June the British simply landed at Milford and took what they needed. Meanwhile, the other British fleet was sailing the Chesapeake, raiding Havre de Grace, Georgetown, and Frenchtown, keeping everyone in New Castle County very nervous.

Eight years after leaving office Haslet ran for governor again and was elected by an even narrower margin than the first time, beating the Federalist candidate James Booth. It was a bitter campaign. Haslet was accused of being a former slave owner, and neglecting the Lewes defenses in 1813. Booth, on the other hand, was accused of being a Loyalist during the American Revolution. Haslet became the only man in the 19th century to win two terms as governor, but his combined victory margins were less than 100 votes. He served from January 21, 1823 for only five months until his death on June 20, 1823.

Death and legacy
Haslet died at Cedar Creek Village in Cedar Creek Hundred, Sussex County. He was first buried on his farm at Cedar Creek Village, but was moved in 1917 to the Odd Fellows Cemetery at Milford. He appears to have died without any heirs, his only son, Nathaniel, having died in 1812 and his second wife, Rachael, in 1820. He was the fourth Governor of Delaware to die in office.

There is no known portrait of Joseph Haslet.

Almanac
Elections were held the first Tuesday of October. The governor takes office the third Tuesday of January and had a three-year term.

Notes

References

External links
Biographical Directory of the Governors of the United States
Delaware’s Governors

The Political Graveyard
Delaware Historical Society; website; 505 North Market Street, Wilmington, Delaware 19801; (302) 655-7161
University of Delaware; Library website; 181 South College Avenue, Newark, Delaware 19717; (302) 831-2965

1769 births
1823 deaths
People from Milford, Delaware
People of colonial Delaware
American people of Scotch-Irish descent
American Presbyterians
American planters
Delaware Democratic-Republicans
Governors of Delaware
Democratic-Republican Party state governors of the United States
Burials in Kent County, Delaware